Diana Darrin (born Harriett B. Tenin; April 15, 1933) is an American actress and singer. She has made over 35 film and television appearances in her career.

Early years
Darrin was the daughter of Mr. and Mrs. Edward Tenin.

Career
Diana Darrin is an American actress of film and television, born in New Haven, Connecticut. She spent the early years of her career appearing in several later Three Stooges films such as He Cooked His Goose, Shot in the Frontier, and A Merry Mix Up. Later appearances include a starring role in The Broken Land with Jack Nicholson, High School Confidential, Reform School Girls, and Slither. She appeared on several television series including Bonanza and McHale's Navy.

Personal life
Darrin was engaged to David Marshall Williams, the inventor of the M1 carbine rifle. They never married, however.

On October 3, 1964, Darrin married Norman R. Kurtzman, her hairdresser, in Los Angeles, California.

Selected filmography

 He Cooked His Goose (1952)
 Pardon My Backfire (1953)
 Paris Model (1953)
 Musty Musketeers (1954)
 Shot in the Frontier (1954)
 Rumpus in the Harem (1956)
 The Bold and the Brave (1956)
 The Cruel Tower (1956)
 A Merry Mix Up (1957)
 Outer Space Jitters (1957)

 Reform School Girls (1957)
 The Incredible Shrinking Man (1957)
 Flying Saucer Daffy (1958)
 Blood Arrow (1958)
 High School Confidential (1958)
 The Broken Land (1962)
 Slither (1973)
 The Naked Ape (1973)

References

External links
http://m.imdb.com/name/nm0201244

1933 births
American women singers
American film actresses
American television actresses
Living people
Actresses from New Haven, Connecticut
21st-century American women